Manuel Angel Manuel Aller Carballo (born April 17, 1963 in Ponferrada, León) is a former Spanish basketball player. With height 1.92 meters tall, he occupied the position of shooting guard.

International career
Aller played the EuroBasket 1989 with the Spanish national team.

External links 
 Manuel Aller, biography
 Player profile on ACB website

1963 births
Spanish men's basketball players
Spanish basketball coaches
Living people
People from Ponferrada
Sportspeople from the Province of León
Liga ACB players
Shooting guards